Lev Mikhailov (1936―2003) was a Russian clarinetist and saxophonist. He taught clarinet and saxophone  at the Moscow Conservatory. Mikhailov performed with the Moscow Radio Orchestra, the Orchestra of the Bolshoi Theatre and the State Symphony Orchestra of the USSR. In 1991 he emigrated to Spain.

Discography
Dmitriev: Chamber And Electronic Music, with the Kyiv Saxophone Quartet and the USSR State Radio Symphony Orchestra. Boheme Music, 2001.
Artyomov: Concert Of The 13, Awakening, with the Russian State Symphony Orchestra and the Moscow Philharmonic Orchestra. Boheme Music, 2001.

References

1936 births
2003 deaths
Russian clarinetists
Russian musicians
Saxophonists
20th-century saxophonists